Eva Sinclair may refer to:

Eva Sinclair (violinist) on My Happiness (album)
Eva Sinclair, fictional character in Under the Dome (TV series)
Eva Sinclair, fictional character in The Originals (TV series)